Richard Peterson may refer to:

 Richard Peterson (fencer) (1940–2018), New Zealand fencer and lawyer
 Richard Peterson (tennis) (1884–1967), Norwegian Olympic tennis player
 Richard A. Peterson (aviator) (1923-2000), American fighter pilot and architect
 Richard A. Peterson (1932–2010), American sociologist and professor of sociology
 Richard E. Peterson (1920–2009), American politician
 Richard L. Peterson (born 1972), American behavioral economist and psychiatrist
 Richard H. Peterson, founder of Peterson Electro-Musical Products
 Dickie Peterson (1946–2009), American bassist and lead singer for Blue Cheer
 Minty Peterson, fictional character in EastEnders

See also
Richard Peters (disambiguation)